Street Coquillière is one of the oldest paths of the 1st district of Paris, in France.

Name origin 
The name "Coquilliere" is derived from the name of the land owner and partial builder of the street, Pierre Coquillier.

Construction and location 
The street was built entirely in 1292 and opened towards the end of the 13th century, shortly after the construction of the enclosure of Philippe Auguste at no.10. 

The street is situated on the Palais-Royal (part between Croix-des-Petits-Champs and rue du Louvre), and the Halles district (between the rue du Louvre and the Saint -Eustache).

History 
On 15 July 1767 the Oblin-Le Camus de Mézière consortium, which had already won the subdivision of the former Soissons hotel and future builder, for the benefit of Armand-Gaston Camus, the Hôtel de Beauvau and the Hôtel du Tillet street in the Rue des Saussaies, was awarded a house in the rue Coquilliere, at the corner of Rue de Grenelle Saint-Honore (now Rue Jean-Jacques Rousseau), in the prolongation of the old hotel of Soissons.

The street has hosted many hotels, such as the Hôtel de Gigault Crisenoy which was occupied by the town hall of the 14th arrondissement from 1796 to 1803.

Notable persons 

 Paul Dukas, the composer and music critic, was born in the building at no.10.

 Sebastien Bottin died in the building at no.16 in 1863.

Present day 
The street consists of residential apartments and offices. There are several restaurants and cafes along the street, as well as a bakery  and small chain supermarket.

Remarkable buildings 

 At the corner of rue du Bouloi and rue Coquilliere, there is a Carmelite monastery.

References

Streets in the 1st arrondissement of Paris